Kawituyuq (Quechua kawitu camp bed; rocking chair; swing; barbecue, -yuq a suffix to indicate ownership, possibly "the one with a camp bed", also spelled Cahuituyoc) is a  mountain in the Andes of Peru. It is located in the Junín Region, Huancayo Province, Huancayo District. Kawituyuq lies south of the Waytapallana mountain range, southwest of Yana Uqsha.

References 

Mountains of Peru
Mountains of Junín Region